Adolphe Jadin (4 May 1794 – 2 November 1867) was a French journalist, chansonnier, librettist and playwright, the son of Louis Emmanuel Jadin.

A bodyguard for Louis XVIII, then for Charles X, captain in the cavalry, his plays were performed on the most important Parisian stages of the 19th century: the Théâtre Beaumarchais, Théâtre de l'Ambigu-Comique, Théâtre national de l'Opéra-Comique, Théâtre des Nouveautés, etc.

Works 
1814: Serment français, 1814
1823: Fanfan et Colas, ou les frères de lait, opéra comique
1825: Ronde en l'honneur du sacre de Charles dix, music by Louis-Emmanuel Jadin
1826: Le Pari, vaudeville in 1 act, with Théodore Anne
1829: Le Vieux marin, ou Une campagne imaginaire, vaudeville in 2 acts, with Théodore Anne and Emmanuel Théaulon
1830: Quoniam, comédie en vaudevilles in 2 acts
1831: Le Carnaval et les arrêts, ou La Famille impromptu, folie-vaudeville in 1 act
1832: Souvenirs de France et d'Écosse
1836: L'Amour et l'homéopathie, vaudeville in 2 acts, with Henri de Tully, 1836
undated: Auprès de toi toute ma vie !, nocturne for 2 voices, music by Louis-Emmanuel Jadin
undated: La Fête du roi !, music by L. Jadin
undated: La fille du pauvre, romance, music by Auguste Andrade
undated: Fuyer cette Beauté cruelle !, romance, music by L. Jadin
undated: Gentille Adèle !, song, music by L. Jadin
undated: Trois Nocturnes à 2 voix, music by L. Jadin
undated: Album lyrique composé de douze romances, chansonnettes & nocturnes, with twelve lithographies by Jules David

Bibliography 
 Sainte-Preuve, Biographie universelle et portative des contemporains, vol.2, 1836, 
 Louis Gustave Vapereau, L'année littéraire et dramatique: 1858-1868, 1868,

External links 
 Obituary

19th-century French dramatists and playwrights
French librettists
French chansonniers
Writers from Paris
1794 births
1867 deaths